The 1982–83 Atlantic Coast Hockey League season was the second season of the Atlantic Coast Hockey League, a North American minor professional league. Six teams participated in the regular season. The Salem Raiders, under new ownership from Henry Brabham, re-branded and changed their name to the Virginia Raiders before the season. The Hampton Roads Gulls folded mid-season. The Carolina Thunderbirds were the league champions.

Regular season

Playoffs

External links
 Season 1982/83 on hockeydb.com

Atlantic Coast Hockey League seasons
ACHL